Imanueli Tiko (born 30 September 1974, in Lautoka) is a Fijian former rugby union player who played as wing.

Career
He first played for Fiji on 22 May 1999, against United States, in San Francisco. Tiko was also part of the Fiji squad in the 1999 Rugby World Cup, playing two matches in the tournament. His last cap for Fiji was on 26 May 2000, against Tonga, in Nuku'alofa.

External links
Manu Tikomaimakogai international stats
Teivovo.com profile

Fiji international rugby union players
Fijian rugby union players
People from Nausori
Living people
1974 births
Sportspeople from Lautoka
Rugby union wings